The Black Hand (German: Die schwarze Hand or Mir kommt keiner aus) is a 1917 Austrian silent crime film directed by Liane Haid, Max Neufeld and Hermann Benke.

Cast
 Ernst Tautenhayn as Amadeus Wipfl 
 Mizzi Schütz as Wipfl's Frau 
 Liane Haid as Wipfl's Tochter 
 Walter Huber as Ottokar Steuer 
 Karl Baumgartner as Jean 
 Christl Giampietro as Minna 
 Max Neufeld as Fritz Waldau 
 Nelly Hochwald as Nelly, Tänzerin 
 Marietta Weber
 Hermann Benke
 Hans Marr
 Hubert Marischka

References

Bibliography
 Parish, Robert. Film Actors Guide. Scarecrow Press, 1977.

External links

1910s crime comedy films
Austrian crime comedy films
1917 Austro-Hungarian films
Austrian silent feature films
Films directed by Jacob Fleck
Films directed by Luise Fleck
Austrian black-and-white films
1917 comedy films
Austro-Hungarian films
Silent crime comedy films
1910s German-language films